Chennault's Flying Tigers (shown as Flying Tigers on the packaging) is a 1981 video game published by Discovery Games for the Apple II, Atari 8-bit family, Commodore PET, and TRS-80.

Gameplay
Flying Tigers is a game in which a squadron of P40C Tomahawk battles Japanese pilots in December, 1941. The game is based on the Flying Tigers who flew over China during World War II. The player is tasked with shooting down Japanese bombers and fighters using a keyboard and a joystick.

Reception
Dr. Johnny Wilson reviewed the game for Computer Gaming World, and stated that "In short, Flying Tigers is an interesting game that is not yet living up to its potential."

References

1981 video games
Apple II games
Atari 8-bit family games
Combat flight simulators
Commodore PET games
Flying Tigers in fiction
Japan in non-Japanese culture
TRS-80 games
Video games developed in the United States
Video games set in China
Works about the Second Sino-Japanese War
World War II video games

External links
Chennault's Flying Tigers at Atari Mania